Estéreo Picnic is a music festival that takes place annually in Bogotá, Colombia. It began in 2010 as a one-day festival showcasing mainly Colombian artists, but low turnout and financial losses during its first three years resulted in a strategic change of direction in 2013, becoming a multi-day festival on a bigger site and inviting major international bands to play alongside artists from Colombia and other Latin American countries. As a result, attendance increased markedly and Estéreo Picnic is now Colombia's biggest alternative music festival and one of the most important music festivals in South America. The musical style of the festival is similar to that of Lollapalooza and European festivals such as Glastonbury, focusing on alternative rock, indie music, punk rock, reggae, electronica and hip hop. Among the acts to have played at Estéreo Picnic since 2013 are American artists The Killers, Red Hot Chili Peppers, Pixies, Nine Inch Nails, Kings of Leon, Jack White, and Snoop Dogg, British groups Gorillaz, New Order, Foals, Kasabian, Mumford & Sons, and Florence and the Machine, and Australian bands Empire of the Sun and Tame Impala. The festival has also featured many of the major groups of the Latin American alternative music scene, including Calle 13, Babasónicos, Café Tacuba, Los Fabulosos Cadillacs, and Aterciopelados, as well as sets from high-profile DJs and dance acts such as Deadmau5, Tiësto, Skrillex, Major Lazer, and Calvin Harris.

History 
The festival was the brainchild of four Colombian friends, Sergio Pabón, Santiago Vélez, Julián Martínez and Julio Correal, who came up with the idea of holding a festival of alternative music in Bogotá after discussing similar festivals that they had attended abroad. Recruiting three more acquaintances, Juan David Shool, Philippe Siegenthaler y Gabriel García, the seven founded a company, Sueño Estéreo (Stereo Dream), to put on the festival. The first edition of Estéreo Picnic was held on 24 April 2010 and featured mostly Colombian acts, headed by American rapper Matisyahu and Belgian dance act 2manydjs. However, the festival attracted fewer than 3000 people. In 2011 and 2012 the promoters more than doubled the number of acts appearing, but attendance was still low, with 4500 people turning up in 2011 and 6000 in 2012. The promoters made a loss of US$80,000 on the 2011 festival, and US$200,000 on the 2012 festival, with the festival only surviving by being subsidised by the money made on other concerts put on by the promoters.

Faced with continuing losses, the promoters took the decision that they needed a major headlining act to boost ticket sales. They booked the Killers, whose debut concert in Colombia in 2009 had attracted 10,000 people, as well as other major supporting acts including New Order and Café Tacuba, and reduced ticket prices by 25%. The organisers hoped that with this new strategy they would sell 18,000 tickets compared with the previous year's 6000: in the event the 2013 festival was attended by 23,324 people. Attendance has since increased every year: the 2015 festival had an attendance of 50,133 and the 2016 edition was attended by an estimated 63,000 people.

Line-ups by year

2010 
The first edition of the festival took place on 24 April 2010.
 Matisyahu
 2manydjs
 Instituto Mexicano del Sonido
 Bomba Estéreo
 The Hall Effect
 Superlitio
 Palenke Soultribe
 Profetas
 Alerta
 La Makintouch
 Afrolatina
 Pizarro (LSCFJ)
 Radio Rebelde Soundsystem

2011 
The 2011 edition of the festival took place on 9 April 2011.

Estéreo Stage:
 The Presets
 Calle 13
 CSS
 ChocQuibTown
 Zoé
 The Sounds
 Hercules and Love Affair
 The Mills
 Monsieur Periné
 Providencia
 Radio Rebelde
 Alfonso Espriella
 Remaj7

El Tiempo Stage:
 The Twelves
 Bag Raiders
 Frente Cumbiero
 Jiggy Drama
 Modex
 Profetas
 Revolver
 Ciegossordomudos
 V for Volume
 Reino del Mar
 Purple Zippers
 LSCFJ
 Sexy Lucy
 Frankie ha Muerto
 Bendito

2012 
The 2012 edition of the festival took place on 30 March 2012.

Estéreo Shock Stage:
 Cassius
 MGMT
 TV on the Radio
 Superlitio
 Yuksek
 Tinie Tempah
 Crew Peligrosos
 Planes
 Soundacity
 Copyright?
 Resina Lalá

Picnic Stage:
 Los Amigos Invisibles
 Gentleman
 Caifanes
 Monsieur Periné
 Systema Solar
 Toy Selectah
 Tres Coronas
 Dënver
 De Bruces a Mi
 La Makina del Karibe
 Armando Quest
 Globos de Aire

2013 
The 2013 edition of the festival took place on 5 and 7 April 2013. It was the first edition of the festival to take place over more than one day, and the first in its new venue of the Parque Deportivo, which has remained its home ever since.

Friday 5 April
Picnic Stage:
 Steve Aoki
 Foals
 Two Door Cinema Club
 Vetusta Morla
 Silencio No Hay Banda
 León Larregui
 Diamante Eléctrico

Sunday 7 April
Estéreo Stage:
 The Killers
 New Order
 Café Tacuba
 Passion Pit
 Carla Morrison
 Juan Cirerol
 Esteman
 Meridian Brothers
Picnic Stage:
 Crystal Castles
 Major Lazer
 Pernett
 Ondatrópica
 Alcolirycoz
 Planes
 Panorama
 Mr. Bleat
 Banda Radioacktiva

2014 
The 2014 edition of the festival took place from 3 to 5 April 2014.

Thursday 3 April
Tigo Music Stage:
 Nine Inch Nails
 Babasónicos
 Julian Casablancas
 Mateo Lewis
Caracol Stage:
 Phoenix
 Capital Cities
 Portugal. The Man
 Dorian
 Árbol de Ojos

Friday 4 April
Tigo Music Stage:
 Red Hot Chili Peppers
 Zoé
 Pixies
 Natalia Lafourcade
 Monsieur Periné
 Juan Pablo Vega
Caracol Stage:
 Empire of the Sun
 Vampire Weekend
 Cut Copy
 AFI
 Savages
 Injury

Saturday 5 April
Tigo Music Stage:
 Tiësto
 Los Fabulosos Cadillacs
 Gogol Bordello
 Bomba Estéreo
 The Wailers
 Cultura Profética
 Camila Moreno
 Antombo
 Oh'laville
Caracol Stage:
 Axwell
 Zedd
 Jovanotti
 La 33
 Gerard
 RVSB
 Lospetitfellas
 Charles King
 Consulado Popular
 Lianna
 El Freaky

2015 
The 2015 edition of the festival took place over 12–14 March 2015. The festival was expanded to include a third stage, the Club Social Music Stage dedicated to DJs and dance music.

Thursday 12 March
Tigo Music Stage:
 Jack White
 Foster the People
 The Kooks
 Telebit
Caracol Stage:
 Skrillex
 SBTRKT
 Astro
 Pedrina & Río
 424
Club Social Music Stage:
 Designer Drugs
 Mitú
 La Tostadora
 El Mató a un Policía Motorizado
 Planes
 Grupo de Expertos Solynieve
 Tan Tan Morgán

Friday 13 March
Tigo Music Stage:
 Kings of Leon
 Aterciopelados
 Damian Marley
 alt-J
 Superlitio
 Milmarías
Caracol Stage:
 Major Lazer
 Kasabian
 Rudimental
 Puerto Candelaria
 Herencia de Timbiquí
 Rancho Aparte
 Danicattack
Club Social Music Stage:
 Seth Troxler
 Chet Faker
 Guberek
 Slow Hands
 Mavidip & Steinlausky
 Balancer
 Okraa
 DMK

Saturday 14 March
Tigo Music Stage:
 Andrés Calamaro
 Calvin Harris
 Miami Horror
 Draco Rosa
 SOJA
 Quique Neira
 Lion Reggae
Caracol Stage:
 Los Amigos Invisibles
 Mala Rodríguez
 Systema Solar
 Compass
 Crew Peligrosos
 Ciegossordomudos
 Elsa y Elmar
 Reyno
 Fatso
Club Social Music Stage:
 Deep Dish
 Crew Love (No Regular Play, Nick Monaco, Soul Clap)
 Ulises Hadjis
 Salt Cathedral
 Caloncho
 Andrés Correa
 Federico Franco

2016 
The 2016 edition of the festival took place from 10 to 12 March 2016. It was preceded by an "inauguration party" in the evening of 9 March at the Bogotá music venue Armando Music Hall, featuring a live set by Eagles of Death Metal. The 2016 festival gained some unexpected international publicity after one of its invited artists, the American rapper Snoop Dogg, mistakenly tagged himself on his Instagram account as being in Bogata, Romania, instead of Bogotá.

Thursday 10 March
Tigo Music Stage:
 Mumford & Sons
 Tame Impala
 Of Monsters and Men
 1280 Almas
Huiwei Stage:
 Die Antwoord
 Odesza
 Bad Religion
 Albert Hammond Jr.
 The Kitsch
Pepsi Music Stage:
 A-Trak
 The Joy Formidable
 La Minitk del Miedo
 Ela Minus
 El Otro Grupo
 Electric Mistakes

Friday 11 March
Tigo Music Stage:
 Florence and the Machine
 Noel Gallagher's High Flying Birds
 Alabama Shakes
 Ximena Sariñana
 Oh'laville
Huiwei Stage:
 Zedd
 Duke Dumont
 Jungle
 Walk the Moon
 Vicente García
 Revolver Plateado
Pepsi Music Stage:
 Jamie Jones
 Patrick Topping
 Christina Rosenvinge
 Francisca Valenzuela
 Unknown Yet
 Little Jesus
 Los Pirañas
 Ismael Ayende

Saturday 12 March
Tigo Music Stage:
 Snoop Dogg
 Jack Ü
 The Flaming Lips
 Seeed
 Lospetitfellas
 Tarmac
Huiwei Stage:
 Kygo
 Sidestepper
 MNKYBSNSS
 Onda Vaga
 Nelda Piña & La Boa
 Sultana
Pepsi Music Stage:
 Alvvays
 Nicolas Jaar
 Nicola Cruz
 Lunate
 Kanaku y El Tigre
 Goli
 Xavier Martinex

2017 
The 2017 edition of the festival took place from 23 to 25 March 2017.

Thursday 23 March
 The Weeknd
 Justice
 The XX
 Rancid
 Cage The Elephant
 G-Eazy
 Glass Animals
 Bob Moses
 Damian Lazarus
 Aj Dávila
 Seis Peatones
 Manook y El Ultimo Esquimal
 Sagan
 Popstitute
 Julio Garces

Friday 24 March
 The Strokes
 Flume
 Two Door Cinema Club
 Caribou
 Silversun Pickups
 Claptone: Immortal Live
 Vance Joy
 Catfish and The Botlemen
 Zalama Crew
 Rawayana
 Arbol de Ojos
 Rat Race
 Cocononó
 Los Makenzy
 Gordon
 N. Hardem
 Los Hot Pants
 Adi

Saturday 25 March
 Deadmau5
 Martin Garrix
 Wiz Khalifa
 Sublime with Rome
 Richie Hawtin
 Toto la Momposina
 Gus Gus
 Quantic
 Chancha Vía Circuito
 Bazurto All Stars
 Nawal
 Mateo Kingman
 Julio Victoria
 Elkin Robinson
 Cero 39
 Romperayo
 Ali A.K.A Mind
 Canalon de Timbiqui
 Buendía

2018 
The 2018 edition of the festival has been confirmed to take place from 23 to 25 March 2018.

Friday 23 March
 The Killers
 Lana Del Rey
 Dillon Francis
 Metronomy
 Tyler, the Creator
 The Neighbourhood
 Milky Chance
 Sofi Tukker
 Thomas Jack
 La chiva Gantiva
 Mnkybsnss
 Centayrys
 Tribu Baharú
 Surcos
 La Ramona
 Saail
 Esteban Copete y su Kinteto Pacífico
 Cohetes

Saturday 24 March
 Gorillaz
 Hardwell
 Bomba Estéreo
 De la Soul
 Galantis
 Mac Demarco
 Ondatrópica
 Kali Uchis
 Dengue Dengue Dengue
 Crew Peligrosos
 La Máquina Camaleón
 N.A.A.F.I
 Moügli
 Alfonso Espriella
 Dany F
 Cynthia Montaño
 Ácido Pantera
 Bleepolar

Sunday 25 March
 LCD Soundsystem
 Dj Snake
 Zoé
 The National
 Royal Blood
 The Black Madonna
 Ow Wonder
 La vida Boheme
 Buscabulla
 Diamante Eléctrico
 Technicolor Fabrics
 Charles King
 Telebit
 La Boa
 Salomón Beda
 Aberlado Carbonó
 Pablo Trujillo
 Tomas Station
 Salvador y el Unicornio

2019 
The 2019 edition of the festival took place from 5 to 7 April 2019.

Friday 5 April
Tigo Stage:
 The Kitsch
 Alcolirykoz
 Interpol
 Twenty One Pilots
 Kendrick Lamar
Adidas Stage:
 Usted Señalemelo
 Ximena Sariñana
 Esteman
 Cuco
 Years & Years
 Rüfüs Du Sol
Axe Stage:
 Silvina Moreno
 Mabiland
 ha$lopablito
 Rap Bang Club
 Mula
 Khruangbin
 Don G
 Jon Hopkins
Budweiser dome:
 Anti
 DJ. Cas
 Las Hermanas
 Debit
 Cayetano
 Kenny Larkin

Saturday 6 April
Tigo Stage:
 TSH Sudaca
 Rhye
 Portugal. The Man
 Grupo Niche
 Underworld
Adidas Stage:
 Alejandro y María Laura
 Apache
 FIDLAR
 Zhu
 Disclosure
 Tiësto
Axe Stage:
 Absalón y Afropacífico
 Pedrina
 Erlend Øye and 'la Comitiva'
 La Payara
 Mitú
 Cerrero
 Nicola Cruz
Budweiser dome:
 Juana Valeria
 Kat
 Leeon
 Volvox
 Defuse
 DJ. Pierre

Sunday 7 April'''
Tigo Stage:
 Nicolás y Los Fumadores
 Bajo Tierra
 The 1975
 Sam Smith
 Arctic Monkeys
Adidas Stage:
 Arrabalero
 Da Pawn
 Irie Kingz
 St. Vincent
 Foals
 Odesza
Axe Stage:
 Montaña
 Las Yumbeñas
 Margarita Siempre Viva
 Quemarlo todo por error
 Los Espíritus
 Carlos Sadness
 Seun Kuti & Fela's Egypt 80
 DJ Koze
Budweiser dome:
 Stay at Home
 Aletti' S 72
 Dorado
 Project Pablo
 Nuclear Digital Transistor
 Soul Clap

2020 
The 2020 edition of the festival was due to take place from 3 to 5 April 2020. The site for the festival this year was moved further north of Bogota to the Briceño 18 golf course in the municipality of Sopó. On 30 January 2020, it was announced that the Wu-Tang Clan would be surprise special guests on the Saturday. However, on 13 March it was announced that the festival had been postponed due to the coronavirus pandemic, and had been rescheduled for 4 to 6 December 2020. On 4 September 2020, it was announced that the 2020 event would not take place, and had been rescheduled for 10 to 12 September 2021.

2022 
The 2022 edition of the festival took place from 25 to 27 of March 2022.

Foo Fighters' drummer Taylor Hawkins died on 25 March 2022, hours before the band were scheduled to perform on the first night of the Festival. The festival stage in which Foo Fighters were scheduled to perform that night was turned into a candlelight vigil for Hawkins.

2023 
The 2023 edition of the festival will take place from 23 to 26 March 2023.

See also 

 List of festivals in Colombia

References

External links 

 Estéreo Picnic website

Music festivals in Colombia
Music festivals established in 2010
2010 establishments in Colombia
Festivals in Bogotá